Vyacheslav Ponomarev  (born 2 January 1978 in Namangan, Uzbek SSR, Soviet Union) is an Uzbek professional football midfielder. Her currently plays for FK Buxoro in the Uzbek League.

Career
Ponomarev started his football career in the Chirchik children and youth's sport school.  He has played football for several clubs in the Uzbek League, including Navbahor Namangan from 1996 to 1998, Dustlik from 1998 to 2000, Pakhtakor in 2001, Metallurg Bekabad in 2002, Qizilqum Zarafshon in 2003, Pakhtakor again in 2004–2007, Kuruvchi from 2007 to 2008. Most recently, he joined Shurtan Guzar in 2009.

International career
Ponomarev has made one appearance for the Uzbekistan national football team in a friendly match against Mongolia on 29 February 2000. He was recalled for national team in 2010, but did not appear in a qualifying match for the 2010 FIFA World Cup against Lebanon.

References

External links

1978 births
Living people
Uzbekistani footballers
Uzbekistan international footballers
Pakhtakor Tashkent FK players
Navbahor Namangan players
Association football midfielders